Meadowlawn may refer to:
Meadowlawn, Louisville, a neighborhood in Louisville, Kentucky
Meadowlawn Plantation, a former plantation house in Lowdnesboro, Alabama